Germany was represented by Wyn Hoop, with the song "Bonne nuit ma chérie", at the 1960 Eurovision Song Contest, which took place on 29 March in London. "Bonne nuit ma chérie" was chosen at the German national final held on 6 February. The song was sung in German despite its French title.

Germany's 1963 Eurovision representative Heidi Brühl finished runner-up in 1960; however her song "Wir wollen niemals auseinandergehn" topped the German singles chart for several weeks and was one of the year's biggest sellers.

Before Eurovision

National final
The national final was held on 6 February at the Rhein-Main-Halle in Wiesbaden, hosted by Hilde Nocker and Werner Fullerer. Ten songs took part, with the winner being decided by a 45-member jury made up of 15 "experts" and 30 members of the public. Whether the opinion of the "experts" carried more weight pro-rata is not known. Only the top three placements are known.

At Eurovision 
On the night of the final Wyn Hoop performed 11th in the running order, following the Netherlands and preceding Italy. There were no specific rules in place as yet in 1960 regarding song length, although European Broadcasting Union guidelines suggested that ideally songs should be no more than 3 minutes 30 seconds in duration. Germany was only one of several countries who appeared to have disregarded the advice, as "Bonne nuit ma chérie" clocked in at 4 minutes 10 seconds. At the close of voting "Bonne nuit ma chérie" had received 11 points, placing Germany joint 4th (with Norway) of the 13 entries. The German jury awarded 7 of its 10 points to Monaco.

Voting 
Every country had a jury of ten people. Every jury member could give one point to his or her favourite song.

References 

1960
Countries in the Eurovision Song Contest 1960
Eurovision